Juan Pellicer Palau (21 February 1901 - 29 January 1956) was a Spanish footballer who played as a right winger for CE Europa.

Club career
Born in Catalonia, he began playing football with CE Europa in 1917. Along with the likes of Mauricio, Cros and Alcázar, he was part of the attacking front of the great CE Europa side of the twenties, that won the Catalan Championship in 1923 after beating Barcelona 1-0 in a play-off title-decider, and reached the 1923 Copa del Rey Final, where they were beaten 0-1 by Athletic Bilbao, courtesy of a goal from Travieso.

International career
Between 1917 and 1930 he played at least 8 games and scored at least 2 goals for the Catalan XI. However, records from the era do not always include accurate statistics and he may have played and scored more. Together with Paulino Alcántara, Josep Samitier and Ricardo Zamora, he was part of the great Catalonia side of the twenties that won two Prince of Asturias Cups, an inter-regional competition organized by the RFEF. In the 1923–24 edition, he scored the winning goal in the quarter-finals against Gipuzkoa, and in the 1926 edition, he netted a goal in the second leg of the final against Asturias to help Catalonia win the match 4-3.

Honours

Club
CE Europa
Catalan football championship:
Champions (1): 1922–23

Copa del Rey:
Runner-up (1): 1923

International
Catalonia
Prince of Asturias Cup:
Champions (2): 1923–24 and 1926

References

1901 births
1956 deaths
Footballers from Catalonia
Spanish footballers
Association football wingers
CE Europa footballers
UE Sant Andreu footballers
FC Martinenc players
Catalonia international footballers